Leendert is a Dutch given name. Notable people with this name include:

 Leendert van Beijeren (1619–1649), Dutch painter
 Leendert Bosch (1924–2017), Dutch biochemist
 Leen Buis (1906–1986), Dutch road cyclist, given name Leendert
 Leendert van der Cooghen (1632–1681), Dutch painter
 Leendert van Dis (born 1944), Dutch rower
 Leendert Antonie Donker (1899–1956), Dutch politician
 Leendert Ginjaar (1928–2003), Dutch politician
 Leendert Hasenbosch (c. 1695–c.1725), Dutch castaway
 Len Hoogerbrug (1929–2019), New Zealand architect
 Leendert Konijn (1899–1977), Dutch entrepreneur in Dutch East Indies
 Leendert Krol (born 1939), Dutch field hockey player
 Leendert de Koningh (1777–1849), Dutch painter
 Leendert de Lange (born 1972), Dutch politician
 Leendert van der Meulen (1937–2015), Dutch cyclist
 Leendert Pieter de Neufville (1729–1797), Dutch banker
 Leendert van Oosten (1884–1936), Dutch wrestler
 Leendert Rojer, Curaçaoan politician
 Leendert Saarloos (1884–1969), Dutch dog breeder
 Leendert Viervant the Younger (1752–1801), Dutch architect and cabinet builder
 Leendert van der Vlugt (1894–1936), Dutch architect

See also
 Leonard
 Leenders

Dutch masculine given names